Coach is an American sitcom television series that aired for nine seasons on ABC from February 28, 1989 to May 14, 1997, with a total of 200 half-hour episodes. The series stars Craig T. Nelson as Hayden Fox, head coach of the fictional NCAA Division I-A Minnesota State University Screaming Eagles football team. For the last two seasons, Coach Fox and the supporting characters coached the Orlando Breakers, a fictional National Football League expansion team. The program also starred Jerry Van Dyke as Luther Van Dam and Bill Fagerbakke as Michael "Dauber" Dybinski, assistant coaches under Fox. The role of Hayden's girlfriend (and later wife) Christine Armstrong, a television news anchor, was played by Shelley Fabares.

Plot
In early seasons, Coach Fox continues to come to grips with the emerging womanhood of his "little girl", Kelly, now a campus coed played by Clare Carey, who after being raised mostly by her mother, enrolled at Minnesota State mainly because she wanted to be near her father. Kelly dated (and eventually married in the second season) theater mime Stuart Rosebrock (Kris Kamm), whom Hayden could not stand. Their marriage ended in 1991 after Stuart, returning from filming his own kids TV show, Buzzy the Beaver, told Kelly that he had met another woman. While overtly supporting Kelly with her heartbreak, Coach Fox clandestinely could not have been happier to have "Stu" out of both of their lives. After graduating from Minnesota State in 1993, Kelly was hired by a major ad agency in New York. She was only seen in occasional guest spots thereafter (and not at all after season 7).

Much of Hayden's coaching job, besides mentoring his players, was working with his defensive coordinator and assistant head coach Luther Van Dam (Jerry Van Dyke), a lifelong bachelor who often struggled with self-confidence and is Hayden's best friend, and special teams coach Michael "Dauber" Dybinski (Bill Fagerbakke), an ex-player at Minnesota State and a kind-hearted, naive "dumb jock" whose ongoing joke was that he had not yet graduated from Minnesota State despite being enrolled for several years there. Despite his seemingly simple nature, Dauber would often surprisingly be of intellectual help to the team, usually learned from a class he was attending or because he was a fan of Nova. Dauber would later graduate with three bachelor's degrees in physical education, business administration, and forestry – without even knowing he was eligible for all three until he got his transcript.

Ladies' basketball coach Judy Watkins (Pam Stone) often engaged in prank wars with Hayden. His relationship with her was complicated by the fact that Dauber dated her until 1995, when she confessed to an affair after returning from a coaching job in Romania. Also seen throughout the run was fussy, budget-conscious Minnesota State athletic director Howard Burleigh (Kenneth Kimmins) and his cheerful wife, Shirley (Georgia Engel), who were close friends with Hayden and Christine.

At the end of season 7, Hayden is offered a job with a fictional NFL expansion team called the Orlando Breakers. Hayden agrees and takes his coaching staff with him for the final two seasons. The Foxes adopted a baby boy named Timothy (played by twins Brennan and Brian Felker). Many season 9 episodes focused on the couple's newfound joy of parenthood, as they had been unable to conceive a child together before they decided to adopt.

Episodes

"Viva Las Vegas" 

The episode "Viva Las Ratings" is part of a crossover with Grace Under Fire, The Drew Carey Show, and Ellen set in Las Vegas. It features Kathy Kinney as Mimi Bobeck, Drew Carey as Drew Carey, Joely Fisher as Paige Clark, and Jeremy Piven as Spence Kovak.

Development 
The creator and producer of the show, Barry Kemp, an alumnus of the University of Iowa, paid homage to his alma mater by naming the main character of Coach (Hayden Fox) after the University of Iowa's longtime football coach Hayden Fry. Many of the exterior shots of "Minnesota State" are actually of the University of Iowa, usually of students walking around the Iowa Memorial Union in downtown Iowa City. The screen shot when returning from commercial breaks is of the outside of the Hillcrest dormitory. There are also numerous shots of Quadrangle Residence Hall as well as the Field House, which once served as the venue for University of Iowa basketball.

Cast

Principal cast

Recurring roles and guest stars 

 Troy Aikman as himself
 George Allen as himself
 Phyllis Avery
 Rick Barry as himself
 Raye Birk as Riley Pringle
 Jim Boeke as Mr. Dybinski
 Dick Butkus as himself
 K Callan as Marion
 Kennedy Cash as newborn Timothy David ("T.D.") Fox
 Drew Carey as Drew Allison Carey
 Gil Christner as Father O'Malley
 Tim Conway as Kenny Montague
 Pat Crawford Brown as Mrs. Thorkelson
 Mike Ditka as himself
 Vlade Divac as Delivery Boy
 Elinor Donahue as Lorraine
 Christopher B. Duncan as Bo Whitley
 Georgia Engel as Shirley Burleigh
 Nanette Fabray as Mildred Armstrong
 Mike Farrell as Jeffrey
 Brennan Felker as Timothy David ("T.D.") Fox
 Brian Felker as Timothy David ("T.D.") Fox
 Eddie George as himself
 Frank Gifford as himself
 Kathie Lee Gifford as herself
 Beth Grant as Martha
 Bob Griese as himself
 Mary Hart as herself
 Brent Hinkley as Delivery Man
 Lou Holtz as himself
 Monica Horan as Maureen
 Keith Jackson as himself
 Jimmy Johnson as himself
 Keyshawn Johnson as himself
 Jerry Jones as himself
 Vicki Juditz as Rosemary
 Lenore Kasdorf as Beth Fox
 Lisa Kudrow as Lauren
 A. J. Langer as Julie
 Lucy Liu as Nicole Wong
 Julio Oscar Mechoso as Martin
 Dick Martin as Peter Plunkett
 Al Michaels as himself
 Kathy Kinney as Mimi Bobeck
 Priscilla Morrill as Pamela Rizzendough
 Noah Nelson as Kevin
 Andrea Parker as Penny/Jean 
 Tom Poston as Dr. Art Hibke, dentist / jeweler
 Robert Prosky as Jake "The Snake" Connelly
 Rob Schneider as Leonard Pierre Kraleman
 Pam Stone as Judy Watkins
 Hank Stram as himself
 Robin Strasser as Elaine Tewksbury
 Barry Switzer as himself
 Todd Susman as Bill
 Rita Taggart as Ruthanne
 Joe Theismann as himself
 Johnny Unitas as himself
 John Valdetero as John
 Dick Van Dyke as Extra
 Yul Vazquez as Alberto Roca
 Bobby Vinton as himself
 Terrence Howard as Johnny Williams 
 James Pickens, Jr., as Rick Williams
 Doria Cook-Nelson as Pamela
 Alan Young as Ranger Farley

Family connections 

 Nanette Fabray, Shelley Fabares's aunt, appeared as Christine Armstrong's mother, Mildred, in four episodes.
 Mike Farrell, Shelley Fabares's husband, appeared as Jeffrey in one episode.
 Noah Nelson, Craig T. Nelson's son, appeared as Kevin, the biological father of the baby whom Hayden and Christine Fox adopt, in two episodes. He also appeared as Minnesota State football player Cody Wilson in one episode and as a delivery boy in another episode.
 Dick Van Dyke, Jerry Van Dyke's brother, appeared as an uncredited extra in one episode as one of Luther's distant relatives.

Setting

Minnesota State University 
In 1963 several bills before the Minnesota State Legislature were developed to create a research university at what was then Mankato State College. Representative Mike McGuire of Montgomery, Minnesota submitted an amendment that would have changed the name of the institution to Minnesota State University. 

During the series run, no school was officially named Minnesota State University. Separately, in 1998 (a year after the show ended) an act of the Minnesota legislature allowed for the renaming of Mankato State University to Minnesota State University, Mankato due to its growing size and to provide better recognition across the Midwest region. As a reaction to this and at the urging of the Board of Trustees of the Minnesota State Colleges and Universities System, two years later, in 2000, Moorhead State University was also renamed Minnesota State University Moorhead to try to provide parity to other regions regarding the impact of the Mankato name change. The common nickname of Minnesota State has always traditionally referred to Minnesota State University, Mankato since this historical period. The athletic programs at Mankato are widely referred to in the media as "Minnesota State", without a city identifier, although its sports teams are named the Mavericks instead of Screaming Eagles.

There are several similarities between fictional Minnesota State University and the real-world Minnesota State Mankato. The Minnesota State Screaming Eagles school colors of purple and gold are also the colors for Minnesota State Mankato and the Minnesota Vikings. The location for the fictional Minnesota State University is never established, however, in several episodes it is mentioned that the campus is located about an hour away from the Twin Cities. The distance from Minneapolis to Mankato is approximately an hour away by car. Coach is shown to live in a cabin near a lake, similarly several faculty in reality live in cabins on nearby Lake Washington. The founding of the fictional university is shown to be 1867 in the opening credits and the real university at times was also referred to as being founded in 1867. Later decisions by school administration placed the official date as being founded in 1868.

During the course of the show, Minnesota State's college football conference affiliation is never mentioned. The Screaming Eagles were mentioned to play big-name schools like Michigan State and Tennessee, but other fictional schools, such as Western Colorado, are also mentioned. In the intro of the show, it is shown that Hayden got his coaching start at Chattanooga University, a fictionalized version of the real-life University of Tennessee at Chattanooga (which brands its athletic program as "Chattanooga"). Outdoor shots of campus and stadium were filmed at Kinnick Stadium at the University of Iowa in Iowa City, Iowa, where creator Barry Kemp went to college. In several episodes, Hayden Fox refers to visiting Christine in the Twin Cities, and it is evident that he is maintaining a long-distance relationship.

In the early 1990s, the producers of the show held a contest to have a real college marching band record the theme song for the show. The contest was won by the Iowa State University Cyclone Football 'Varsity' Marching Band, and their recording was used as the theme until the series ended. The Iowa State University Cyclone Football 'Varsity' Marching Band was also shown in the opening sequence of the show.

In the 1993–1994 television season, Hayden Fox led his Minnesota State Screaming Eagles to victory in the Pioneer Bowl, held in San Antonio, winning the national championship. In real life, Florida State won the national championship that season. The Alamodome opened in May 1993, in time for the real-life 1993 football season. However, the first Alamo Bowl and Pioneer Bowl games had not been played yet. Also, the real-life Pioneer Bowl is not even an NCAA Division I game, but rather a now-defunct postseason game played between the champions of two Division II conferences whose members are all historically black schools (the game ceased to be held after 2012). Footage from the 1993 edition of the Wisconsin vs. Minnesota rivalry game played in the Metrodome was used for the actual game to represent Minnesota State and the fictional West Texas University (not to be confused with the real West Texas A&M University or Texas Western College, now known as UTEP). Then-ABC sportscaster Al Michaels provides the commentary during the game.

Orlando Breakers 
In the 1995 season, Hayden Fox gets a chance to fulfill his ultimate dream and become the head coach of an NFL team. He accepts the head coaching position with the (fictional) expansion team the Orlando Breakers, owned by recent widow Doris Sherman (played by Katherine Helmond). Sherman, however, is more interested in making money off of the team as well as gimmicks (such as asking if Hayden would like to coach a basketball team she was thinking of buying after selling the Breakers and trading away their first-round draft pick for a pair of cruise tickets) than she is in letting Coach Fox guide the Breakers to success on the football field. Nearly the entire crew from Minnesota State followed Fox to Orlando, including Luther and Dauber, who remained his assistant coaches. In the final season, Hayden is able to coach the Breakers to a wild card spot in the NFL Playoffs but loses to the Buffalo Bills in that playoff game at Buffalo.

The name Orlando Breakers was a salute to the original USFL and the Boston/New Orleans/Portland Breakers. The Breakers themselves were a parody of the fellow Florida-based Jacksonville Jaguars, who, like the Breakers, joined the NFL in 1995 as an expansion team and made the playoffs their second season as a wild card team and, like the Breakers, played the Bills in their first playoff game. (Unlike the Breakers, the Jaguars came out victorious, 30–27, eventually losing to the New England Patriots 20–6 in the AFC Championship Game.) Another tie-in between the Breakers and the Jaguars was that the first game the latter played in, the 1995 Pro Football Hall of Fame Game (against their expansion brethren the Carolina Panthers), aired on ABC, the same network as Coach.

Series finale 
The 200th and final episode of the sitcom, titled "Leaving Orlando", aired on ABC on May 14, 1997. The final scene in the final episode featured the whole cast thanking the audience for nine years of the show and showing a plaque commemorating it, with cast member Jerry Van Dyke denying the series ending, thinking the show must go on. But the cast and director finally tell Van Dyke that the show is truly over, with Van Dyke still denying the show's finale: As the lights go out, Van Dyke mumbles, "I don't care what you say, I'm coming to work Monday."

The final episode also includes an epilogue showing that Hayden retired from coaching and moved back to his cabin in Minnesota to raise his son, with Christine being a working wife at a local station. Luther also retired and continued his relationship with Doris, building a Graceland style manor as tribute to his idol, Elvis Presley. Howard and Shirley sold their collection of rare Barbie dolls, using the capital to acquire and manage a successful dinner theatre in Florida. Dauber succeeded Hayden as the head coach of the Breakers, winning back-to-back Super Bowl championships and going on to join the Monday Night Football announcing team after his retirement from football. The final scene shows a 10-year-old Tim having two friends who bear a striking resemblance to child versions of Dauber and Luther.

Syndication 
The show entered local syndication reruns in September 1993. Reruns have also previously aired on Antenna TV, ReelzChannel, WGN America, USA Network, Nick at Nite and TBS.

Netflix discontinued Coach on September 15, 2015.

Roku currently offers the entire series free on demand.

Awards 

 Emmy Awards:
 1992: Primetime Emmy Award for Outstanding Lead Actor – Comedy Series (Craig T. Nelson)
 1996: Primetime Emmy Award for Outstanding Guest Actor – Comedy Series (Tim Conway)
 American Society of Composers, Authors and Publishers (ASCAP) Awards:
 1992: Top TV Series
 1993: Top TV Series
 1994: Top TV Series
 1995: Top TV Series
 1996: Top TV Series

Scheduling conflict with Monday Night Football 

For season seven, ABC aired original episodes of Coach on Monday night, before Monday Night Football, as part of a football-themed night. This was successful on the United States east coast, where MNF games aired from 9:00 pm to 12:30 am, local time. However, on the west coast, MNF games aired from 6:00 pm to 9:30 pm (with possible overtime), leaving some Monday network programming with no time slots. During this interval, the show was aired at unusual hours on the west coast. For instance, Seattle ABC affiliate KOMO aired new episodes of Coach on Saturday afternoons (coincidentally, ABC also aired college football games most of the time on Saturday afternoons). Some fans have cited this time-slot displacement on the west coast as a reason for low ratings in season seven. Coach was moved to Wednesday nights before the end of the season, and was then moved back to Tuesday nights the following season; this resulted in a bump in ratings, returning Coach to the top 20.

Home media
Universal Pictures has released the first four seasons of Coach on DVD in Region 1. Two different versions were released of the first season: a regular edition and a limited edition which featured special packaging (a playbook).

On July 1, 2016, it was announced that Mill Creek Entertainment had acquired the rights to the series in Region 1; they subsequently re-released the first two seasons on DVD on September 6, 2016.

On September 12, 2017, Mill Creek released Coach – The Complete Series on DVD in Region 1 for the very first time.  The 18-disc set contains all 9 seasons of the series, the first time episodes beyond season 4 have been available on DVD.

Universal Pictures UK released season 1 on DVD in Region 2 on August 7, 2006.

Attempted sequel 
On March 26, 2015, NBC ordered 13 episodes of a sequel series to Coach, set to focus on Hayden Fox's son, who had recently taken a coaching job at a small college. Most of the original series' stars were set to reprise their roles, except for Shelley Fabares who was battling autoimmune hepatitis. Her role as Christine, Hayden's wife, was to be written off as having died with Hayden written as a recent widower. On August 31, 2015, TVLine reported the series had been cancelled due to the pilot having "mixed results".

Notes

References

External links 
 
 
 

1989 American television series debuts
1997 American television series endings
1980s American sitcoms
1990s American sitcoms
1980s American workplace comedy television series
1990s American workplace comedy television series
American Broadcasting Company original programming
American football television series
1980s American college television series
College football television series
English-language television shows
Primetime Emmy Award-winning television series
Television series by Universal Television
Television shows set in Orlando, Florida
Television shows set in Minnesota
1990s American college television series